UFC on FX: Belfort vs. Rockhold (also known as UFC on FX 8) was a mixed martial arts event held on May 18, 2013, at the Arena Jaraguá in Jaraguá do Sul, Brazil.  The event was broadcast live on FUEL TV and FX.

Background
The event was headlined by a middleweight bout between perennial multi-divisional contender Vitor Belfort and the final Strikeforce Middleweight Champion and promotional newcomer and future UFC Middleweight Champion Luke Rockhold.

Manvel Gamburyan was expected to face Hacran Dias at the event.  However, Gamburyan was forced to pull out of the bout citing an injury and was replaced by Nik Lentz.

Marcos Vinícius was expected to face Iuri Alcântara at the event. However, Vinicius was forced out of the bout citing an injury and was replaced by promotional newcomer Iliarde Santos

Cezar Ferreira was originally scheduled to face CB Dollaway.  However, on April 1, it was revealed that Dollaway had to withdraw from the bout due to injury and he was replaced by Chris Camozzi. Then on April 7, it was confirmed that Ferreira had pulled out of the fight as well, citing an injury and was replaced by Rafael Natal.

Costas Philippou had to withdraw from his fight against Ronaldo Souza, after suffering a cut above his eye, and was replaced by Chris Camozzi.  Camozzi's scheduled opponent Rafael Natal instead faced promotional newcomer João Zeferino.

Paulo Thiago was originally expected to face Lance Benoist. However, on April 20, it was announced that Benoist had to pull out of the bout due to an injury and was replaced by UFC newcomer Michel Prazeres.

Results

Bonus awards
The following fighters were awarded $50,000 bonuses.

 Fight of the Night: Lucas Martins vs. Jeremy Larsen
 Knockout of the Night: Vitor Belfort
 Submission of the Night: Ronaldo Souza

See also
List of UFC events
2013 in UFC

References

External links
Official UFC past events page
UFC events results at Sherdog.com

UFC on FX
2013 in mixed martial arts
Mixed martial arts in Brazil
Sport in Jaraguá do Sul
2013 in Brazilian sport
May 2013 sports events in South America